Tondoro is a settlement in the Kavango West region of northern Namibia, and the administrative centre of the Tondoro Constituency.

There is a Catholic mission in the village, called the St. Laurence Mission. It was founded in 1927 by Father Weilhöfer of the Missionary Oblates of Mary Immaculate and it is  staffed by them.

The staff of the mission consists of five sisters of the Order of Saint Benedict of Tutzing, and they staff a girl's hostel and a clinic. The Mission serves 35 communities spread along the Kavango River. They use two deacons to assist them in serving this vast number of people. The Deacons are Dc. Moses Kandjimi Murangi, and Dc. Erwin Masambo Musunga.

The outstation communities are: Canchana, Desi, Ekuli, Gcarhuwa, Kahenge, Kukuwa, Kamupupu, Kaparara, Katara, Katope Island, K.M. Sekondere, Makambu, Matava, Mbambamusi, Mbome, Mburu-uru, Mpengu, Mukekete, Musese, Nambi, Namutuntu, Nepara, Ngandu, Nkurenkuru, Nzinze, Simanya, Sitopogo, Tjara, Tuguva, Yinsu.

References

Populated places in Kavango West
Catholic missions in Kavango